Zoltán Sztanity (born February 1, 1954) is a Hungarian sprint canoer who competed from the mid-1970s to the early 1980s. Competing in two Summer Olympics, he won a silver medal in the K-1 500 m event at Montreal in 1976.

Sztanity also won two medals at the ICF Canoe Sprint World Championships with a gold (K-1 4 x 500 m: 1975) and a bronze (K-1 500 m: 1977).

References

External links
 

1954 births
Canoeists at the 1976 Summer Olympics
Canoeists at the 1980 Summer Olympics
Hungarian male canoeists
Living people
Olympic canoeists of Hungary
Olympic silver medalists for Hungary
Olympic medalists in canoeing
ICF Canoe Sprint World Championships medalists in kayak
Medalists at the 1976 Summer Olympics
20th-century Hungarian people